Betty (stylized as BETTY) is an alternative rock group from New York City.

Biography 
The band was formed in Washington D.C. around the scene of the 9:30 club.

In 1989, the band relocated to New York City. The name of their first album, Hello, Betty! comes from the standard opening for all their appearances. In 1995, the band expanded by adding Tony Salvatore on lead guitar and drums to the initial line-up of vocals with electronic accompaniment, bass and cello.

Betty appeared in every episode of the 1989 HBO series Encyclopedia, singing educational songs each centered on a particular word, as well as performing the opening and closing theme songs. The members involved were Alyson Palmer, Amy Ziff, and Elizabeth Ziff, although they were credited in the show's opening titles as simply "Betty".

In 2002 the group starred in its own off-Broadway show Betty Rules directed by Rent's Michael Greif. The musical ran for nine months at the Zipper Theatre. The show has since been performed in Chicago at the Lakeside Theatre and sold-out three runs at Theater J in Washington, DC. Betty has appeared as a regular guest artist on the television show The L Word, for which they provided the theme song.

Activist entertainers, Betty is as well known for their performances at rallies for causes in which they believe.

Line-up
 Elizabeth Ziff (vocals, guitar)
 Alyson Palmer (vocals, bass)
 Amy Ziff  (vocals, cello)
 Tony Salvatore (lead guitar)
 Mino Gori (drums)

Discography
 1992: Hello, Betty!
 1994: Kiss My Sticky (EP)
 1996: Limboland
 1999: betty3
 2000: Carnival
 2002: Betty Rules: Original
 2016: On The Rocks

Cast recording
 2004: Snowbiz (EP)
 2009: Bright & Dark
 2013  Rise (EP)

Television series
 1986: Encyclopedia—HBO (house band)
 Real Sex—HBO (theme song)
 The L Word—Showtime (theme song and regular appearances)
 Weeds—Showtime (end credits song, season 6, episode 8)
 Cover Shot—TLC (theme song)
 Out on the Edge—Comedy Central (house band and theme song)
 Ms. Adventure—Animal Planet (theme song)
 Fashionably Late—TLC (theme song)
 Remote Control—MTV (guest appearance)
 USA Up All Night—USA (guest host)
 Love Bites—NBC (2011)

Filmography
 1993: Life with Mikey
 1994: It's Pat
 1995: The Incredibly True Adventures of Two Girls in Love
 1997: First We Take Manhattan
 1999: The Out-of-Towners

Additional performances/recordings
 Rock for Choice
 June 10, 1992: Sondheim: A Celebration at Carnegie Hall

References

External links
http://www.hellobetty.com
http://www.bettyrules.com/

Alternative rock groups from New York (state)
Alternative rock groups from Washington, D.C.